Ellis Township is a township in Hardin County, Iowa, USA.

History
Ellis Township was organized in 1856. It was named for Judge Ellis Parker, of Eldora.

References

Townships in Hardin County, Iowa
Townships in Iowa
1856 establishments in Iowa